Clerk Saunders is Child ballad 69.  It exists in several variants.

Synopsis

Clerk Saunders and may Margaret ("may" meaning maiden and being a title rather than a name) are walking in the garden.  He persuades her to go to bed with him before their marriage, saying that he will let himself in and she can cover her eyes, so that she can swear that she did not let him in or see him.  Her seven brothers catch them and argue over what to do, but the youngest kills him without a word, and Margaret finds him dead in the morning.  They bury him.

In some versions his ghost appears at her window and tells her she must release him from his promise.  She demands a kiss, but he tells her it would kill her.  She frees him.

Variants
The woman who attempts to conceal her lover, and the family members who find him, are common ballad motifs.  Willie and Lady Maisry has much in common with it.
There are also variants on Sweet William's Ghost (Child 77, version F) in which the name Clerk Saunders is used, and with content akin to the end of the song.

Recordings

Frequently recorded by some of the best known names in the English and Scottish folk traditions.  Well-known recordings include:
 Jean Redpath on her 1980 album, Lowlands
 Emily Smith on her 2014 album, Echoes
 Malinky on their 2005 album, The Unseen Hours
 Eliza Carthy on the 1996 album, Heat Light and Sound
 June Tabor on her second solo album, Ashes and Diamonds from 1977
 Martin Simpson on Kind Letters (2005) and various collections

Depictions
Clerk Saunders is the subject, and title, of paintings by Edward Burne-Jones in the Tate Collection and Elizabeth Siddal, currently in the collection of the Fitzwilliam Museum.

See also
Sweet William's Ghost

References

External links
Clerk Saunders

Child Ballads
Fictional ghosts